The Tzadikim Nistarim ("hidden righteous ones") or Lamed Vav Tzadikim (x"36 righteous ones"), often abbreviated to Lamed Vav(niks), refers to 36 righteous people, a notion rooted within the mystical dimensions of Judaism. The singular form is Tzadik Nistar.

Origins
The existence of 36 righteous people is first mentioned in the Talmud:
There are no fewer than 36 righteous people in the world who greet the Shekhinah in each generation.

Another Talmudic passage mentions the righteous people, most of them unknown, who sustain the world. However, it gives a number other than 36:
"A homer of barley, and a letech of barley" - [this refers to] 45 righteous who cause the world to be sustained ...  30 in the land of Israel and 15 here [in Babylonia]. Abaye said: And most of them can be found in the synagogue, under the upper room [i.e. among the unhonored masses].

These two sources were combined into the idea that the world is sustained by 36 righteous people. The combination may have derived from the fact that to "greet the Shekhinah" was originally associated with Temple service, and Temple service was considered to sustain the world (Pirkei Avot 1:2).

The idea of 36 righteous became fully fleshed out in later generations:
As a mystical concept, the number 36 is even more intriguing. It is said that at all times there are 36 special people in the world, and that were it not for them, all of them, if even one of them was missing, the world would come to an end. The two Hebrew letters for 36 are the lamed, which is 30, and the vav, which is 6. Therefore, these 36 are referred to as the Lamed-Vav Tzadikim.

The idea is particularly prominent in Hasidic Judaism. Tzvi Elimelech Spira of Dinov, for example, wrote that "in every generation, there are great righteous people who could perform wondrous acts, but the generation is not deserving of that, so the stature of the righteous people is hidden and they are not known to the public; sometimes they are woodchoppers or water-drawers."

Revealed and hidden righteous
The Baal Shem Tov wrote that "just as there are 36 hidden righteous, there are 36 revealed righteous."

And just as there are innumerable clusters of stars, so, too, there are innumerable clusters of righteous people," which indicates that there are significantly more than 36 in the world.

Their purpose

Mystical Hasidic Judaism as well as other segments of Judaism believe that there exist thirty-six righteous people whose role in life is to justify the purpose of humanity in the eyes of God. Jewish tradition holds that their identities are unknown to each other and that, if one of them comes to a realization of their true purpose, they would never admit it:

The Lamed-Vav Tzaddikim are also called the Nistarim ("concealed ones"). In our folk tales, they emerge from their self-imposed concealment and, by the mystic powers, which they possess, they succeed in averting the threatened disasters of a people persecuted by the enemies that surround them. They return to their anonymity as soon as their task is accomplished, 'concealing' themselves once again in a Jewish community wherein they are relatively unknown. The lamed-vavniks, scattered as they are throughout the Diaspora, have no acquaintance with one another. On very rare occasions, one of them is 'discovered' by accident, in which case the secret of their identity must not be disclosed. The lamed-vavniks do not themselves know that they are one of the 36. In fact, tradition has it that should a person claim to be one of the 36, that is proof positive that they are certainly not one. Since the 36 are each exemplars of anavah, ("humility"), having such a virtue would preclude against one’s self-proclamation of being among the special righteous. The 36 are simply too humble to believe that they are one of the 36.

Lamedvavniks

Lamedvavnik, is the Yiddish term for one of the 36 humble righteous ones or Tzadikim mentioned in kabbalah or Jewish mysticism. According to this teaching, at any given time there are at least 36 holy persons in the world who are Tzadikim. These holy people are hidden; i.e., nobody knows who they are. According to some versions of the story, they themselves may not know who they are. For the sake of these 36 hidden saints, God preserves the world even if the rest of humanity has degenerated to the level of total barbarism. This is similar to the story of Sodom and Gomorrah in the Hebrew Bible, where God told Abraham that he would spare the city of Sodom if there was a quorum of at least 10 righteous men. Since nobody knows who the Lamedvavniks are, not even themselves, every Jew should act as if he or she might be one of them; i.e., lead a holy and humble life and pray for the sake of fellow human beings. It is also said that one of these 36 could potentially be the Jewish Messiah if the world is ready for them to reveal themselves. Otherwise, they live and die as an ordinary person. Whether the person knows they are the potential Messiah is debated.

The term lamedvavnik is derived from the Hebrew letters Lamed (L) and Vav (V), whose numerical value (see Gematria) adds up to 36. The "nik" at the end is a Russian or Yiddish suffix indicating "a person who..." (As in "Beatnik"; in English, this would be something like calling them "The Thirty-Sixers".) The number 36 is twice 18. In gematria (a form of Jewish numerology), the number 18 stands for "life", because the Hebrew letters that spell chai, meaning "living", add up to 18. Because 36 = 2×18, it represents "two lives".

In some Hasidic stories, disciples consider their Rebbes and other religious figures to be among the Lamedvavniks. It is also possible for a Lamedvavnik to reveal themselves as such, although that rarely happens—a Lamedvavnik'''s status as an exemplar of humility would preclude it. More often, it is the disciples who speculate.

These beliefs are articulated in the works of Max Brod, and some (like Jorge Luis Borges) believe the concept to have originated in the Book of Genesis 18:26:

In popular culture
 In the 1880 play The Two Kuni-Lemls by Avrom Goldfaden, Pinkhsel surmises that Kuni-Leml, the man betrothed to his daughter Carolina, is a "lamed-vovnik" because of the mysterious changes to his behavior and ability. In fact, it is Max, Carolina's love interest, who keeps reentering the house disguised as Kuni-Leml. 
 A play by Hans Rehfisch called Nickel and the 36 Righteous is a comedy in 3 acts (1925).
 Jorge Luis Borges has an entry for the "Lamed Wufniks" in his Book of Imaginary Beings (1957-1969).
 In the 1959 novel The Last of the Just by Andre Schwarz-Bart, one Just Man of the Lamed-Vov is designated in each generation of the family of Levy. Their legacy is traced over eight centuries. The original French title was Le Dernier des Justes.
 In the 1984 novel The Journeyer by Gary Jennings, Marco Polo is periodically saved from death by the 36. The rescuer's identity is never made explicit, and he may be more than one of the Righteous Men.
 In the 1988 novel The Quest for the 36 by Steven Bilias, Dexter Sinister, a booking agent, gets tasked by God to collect the 36 so they can avert the end of the world.
 In the 1991 issue "Three Septembers and a January", from Neil Gaiman's comic The Sandman, Death remarks to the soul of Joshua Norton: "they say that the world rests on the backs of 36 living saints – 36 unselfish men and women. Because of them the world continues to exist. They are the secret kings and queens of this world" with the implication that he was one of the Tzadikim.
 In the 1998 book "Stories of Deliverance", originally entitled "Les Justes" in French, translated by Michael Bernard from an original set of apparently true tales written by Marek Halter in the 1990s, relates the histories of 36 brave people who selflessly helped save victims and potential victims from World War II atrocities. The idea for the book came from the traditional assumption of The Righteous Ones being ever-present in the world.
 In the 1998 documentary The Cruise, it is suggested that the films subject, Tim "Speed" Levitch, a tour guide for Manhattan's Gray Line double-decker buses, is a Lamed Vovnick.
 In the 1999 novel Lords of Light: A Novel by Deepak Chopra, the Lamed Vav are depicted, one of them who betrayed God posing as the new Messiah.
 In the 1999 novel Keeping Faith by Jodi Picoult, the main character, Faith White, is believed to be one of the Lamed Vovnik by Rabbi Solomon.
 In the 2001 film Invincible by Werner Herzog, a fictionalized account of the life of Jewish strongman Zishe Breitbart (aka Siegmund Breitbart), a Berlin Rabbi tells Zishe (played by Jouko Ahola) that he may be one of the 36 just men who feel the suffering of the world.
 The 2003 movie Time of the Wolf by Michael Haneke makes reference to the 36, a secondary character hinted as being one of them.
 In the 2005 novel The History of Love by Nicole Krauss, Alma's brother Bird believes himself to be a Lamed Vovnik, one of the 36 special people in the world.
 The 2006 mystery thriller novel The Righteous Men by Sam Bourne deals with the murder of the righteous ones, one by one, and solving the murders.
 In the 2007 novel The Yiddish Policemen's Union by Michael Chabon, the protagonist, Detective Landsman's case involves the murder victim who may have been the Tzadik Ha-dor.
 The 2007 novel The Book of Names by Jill Gregory and Karen Tintori is a thriller based on the actual principles of the Kabbalah, which teaches that the world's existence requires that it be occupied by 36 Lamed vovniks.
 In the 2008–2012 series "The Jerusalem Undead" ("Field of Blood", "Haunt of Jackals" and "Valley of Bones") by Christian fiction writer, Eric Wilson, the main character is the daughter of one of the lamed Vav and the stories about her father's past include him being hidden and secretive due to his status as one of the Lamed Vav.
 In the 2009 Coen Brothers film, A Serious Man, the eulogy spoken by the rabbi at a funeral refers to the deceased, Sy Abelman, as perhaps having been a "Lamed Vavnik".
 In the 2009 novel Let the Great World Spin by Colum McCann, the narrator of the Book One mentions hearing of the myth of "thirty-six hidden saints" while in college and compares the actions of his Christian brother Corrigan to one of the saints.
 In the 2011 novel The Last Good Man by A.J. Kazinski, there is a serial killer who tries to kill all the 36 good men.
 In the 2012 television series Touch, season 1, episode 9, "Music of the Spheres", Jacob "Jake" Bohm, a mute boy who mysteriously feels the suffering of those along his path and aims to positively adjust their fates, is revealed as possibly one of the "Lamed Vav Tzadikim" by a Hasidic man. In the second season of Touch, Jake and other people who have special gifts are referred to as members of the 36; throughout the episodes they are exploited for their capabilities and are hunted down by one who believes they hold too much power. The final episode features consideration of the Kabbalah and the mystical roots of the legend of the 36.
 In the 2013 novel Eyes Wide Open by Ted Dekker, the 36 are a group of children called Project Showdown. Orphans were raised by Christian monks to follow the path of light, in an attempt to rebirth the Earth into a new age.
 The 2013 film "36 Saints" is loosely based on the legend of the 36.
 In the 2016 television series Transparent, season 3, episode 5, "Oh Holy Night", Rabbi Raquel Fine, while holding a lit candle, addresses the attendees of a Hinei with a discussion of the who the 36 people who sustain the world's righteousness may be. "Who are these 36? We don't know. Even the 36 don't know. So what is the lesson? The lesson is to treat each other...as if we might be one. Or who knows? You might be standing next to one now."
 In the 2017 television series Kevin (Probably) Saves the World, the title character is chosen to be a righteous soul who has to find and initiate the other 35.
The 2019 novel "Nistarim: The Awakened" by author JD McCroskey is loosely based on the Lamed Vav, though it has more supernatural elements than traditional Lamed Vav lore. The "Angelic Human Series" by said author is scheduled for a three-book run, all following the Lamed Vav. As of 2020, the first two volumes have appeared.
The 2019 novel “36 Righteous Men” by best-selling author Steven Pressfield derives its title and some material from the idea of the Lamed Vav.
 The 2020 novel "Ministry for the Future" by Kim Stanley Robinson mentions the tradition in Chapter 28.
Rabbi Shlomo Carlebach frequently spoke of "lamedvavniks".

Notes
  In Hebrew numerals, 30 is lamed, and 6 is vav''. The number 36 is written .

References

External links
 Why Thirty-Six?

Jewish mysticism
Jewish religious occupations
Jewish theology

es:36 justos